Myosotis discolor is a species of forget-me-not known by the common name changing forget-me-not. It is native to Europe, and it can also be found throughout eastern and western North America, where it is an introduced species. It grows in many types of habitat, including disturbed areas such as roadsides.

Description
It is a hairy annual or perennial herb growing 10 to 50 centimeters tall with a slender, sometimes branching, erect stem. The sparse linear, lance-shaped, or oblong leaves are up to 4 centimeters long and under a centimeter wide. They are coated in straight hairs. The inflorescence is a coiled or curved array of tiny (less than 2mm) flowers at the top of the stem. The flowers are initially yellow or cream, changing to pink and then to blue as they mature, giving rise to the common name.

Gallery

Inflorescences

Flowers

Herbarium

Botanical illustrations

References

External links
Jepson Manual Treatment
Burke Museum Profile
Photo gallery

discolor